The women's 400 metres hurdles event at the 2001 Summer Universiade was held at the Workers Stadium in Beijing, China on 30–31 August.

Medalists

Results

Heats

Semifinals

Final

References

Athletics at the 2001 Summer Universiade
2001 in women's athletics
2001